INS Malpe an Indian Naval minesweeper ship, named after a port in Malabar coast Malpe. She remained in service until decommissioned at Naval Base, Kochi on 4 December 2006.

Service

References

Mahé-class minesweepers